Fotis Koutzavasilis (born 11 March 1989) is a Greek professional footballer who plays as a goalkeeper for Iraklis Larissa.

References

1989 births
Living people
Greek footballers
Super League Greece players
Football League (Greece) players
Super League Greece 2 players
PAOK FC players
Panserraikos F.C. players
PAE Kerkyra players
AO Chania F.C. players
Association football goalkeepers
Footballers from Serres